Print design, a subset of graphic design, is a form of visual communication used to convey information to an audience through intentional aesthetic design printed on a tangible surface, designed to be printed on paper, as opposed to presented on a digital platform. A design can be considered print design if its final form was created through an imprint made by the impact of a stamp, seal, or dye on the surface of the paper.

History 
There are several methods used to create print design artworks, spanning more than five hundred years. Printing technologies available throughout history heavily influenced the style of designs created by graphic designers at the time of production, as different methods of creating print design offer varying features. Before the emergence of the design and printing technologies of the twentieth and twenty-first century such as the inkjet printer, Adobe Illustrator, Adobe Photoshop, and Adobe InDesign, print design relied on mechanical technologies such as the letterpress and lithography.

Letterpress 

The letterpress, perfected in the mid fifteenth century by Johannes Gutenberg (1398-1468) through the combined use of the printing press, oil-based inks, and cast metal type, remained the most common and efficient method of printing until the 1960s. Used frequently with typography design and type layout, the letterpress operates through the stamping of type and photo-engraved metal blocks on paper. The metal blocks are arranged in a frame by the printer, and the text columns and etchings are separated by vertical or horizontal metal bars; it is even possible to arrange the blocks at an angle using a letterpress. With the letterpress, print design and graphics remained black and white print on paper until the late nineteenth century. The letterpress was the first technology that allowed for mass production and distribution of printed material at a large scale, and because of this, quickly replaced the slow processes of woodblock printing and hand copying of print design.

Lithography 

Lithography, introduced at the end of the nineteenth century, allowed for the use of color in prints and allowed artists to print on larger surfaces than the letterpress. Additionally, lithography enabled artists to draw their own lettering on designs, which was not possible with the letterpress. The design was drawn directly onto the stone by the artist, and then transferred onto the surface of the paper.

Uses 
Print design remains prevalent in society through all forms of communicative design. The importance of printed visual design was highlighted during the first world war, as posters helped to inform and instruct the audience. A short list of print design's uses today includes:
 Posters
 Brochures
 Flyers
 Packaging labels
 Business cards
 Book covers
 Book design and layout
 Magazines
 Banners
 Receipts
 Shopping bags

References

Graphic design
Communication design